Tom Cassidy (born March 15, 1952) is a Canadian former professional ice hockey centre who briefly played in the National Hockey League for the Pittsburgh Penguins.

Career statistics

External links

1952 births
Living people
Baltimore Clippers players
California Golden Seals draft picks
Canadian ice hockey centres
Ice hockey people from Ontario
Kitchener Rangers players
People from Algoma District
Pittsburgh Penguins players
Oklahoma City Stars players
Rochester Americans players
Springfield Kings players